Aula-Vintri is a village in Saaremaa Parish, Saare County, Estonia, on the island of Saaremaa.

As of 2011 Census, the settlement's population was 19.

Before the administrative reform in 2017, the village was in Lääne-Saare Parish.

References

Villages in Saare County